Zacorisca delphica is a species of moth of the family Tortricidae. It is found on New Guinea.

The wingspan is about 21 mm. The forewings are silvery white with a black costal edge and with a series of irregular black marks. The hindwings are yellowish white with a moderate suffused dark grey streak along the upper half of the termen.

References

	

Moths described in 1910
Zacorisca